The Taulil–Butam or Butam–Taulil languages are a small language family spoken in East New Britain Province, Papua New Guinea. They may be related to the Baining languages. Speakers consistently report that their ancestors came from New Ireland.

Classification
The languages are:
Taulil
Butam (extinct)

The languages are not close but are clearly related. They are classified with the Baining languages in an East New Britain family by Ross (2001, 2005), based on similarities in their pronominal paradigms, but so far no other work has been done to support such a connection. The Austronesian impact on the languages, or at least on Taulil, is small.

See also
Baining languages
Papuan languages

References

 Ross, Malcolm (2005). Pronouns as a preliminary diagnostic for grouping Papuan languages." In: Andrew Pawley, Robert Attenborough, Robin Hide and Jack Golson, eds, Papuan pasts: cultural, linguistic and biological histories of Papuan-speaking peoples, 15-66. Canberra: Pacific Linguistics.

External links
East New Britain languages database at TransNewGuinea.org

 
East New Britain languages

Languages of East New Britain Province